Supplier may refer to:

Manufacturer, uses tools and labour to make things for sale
Processor (manufacturing), converts a product from one form to another
Packager (manufacturing), encloses products for distribution, storage, sale, and use
Distributor (business), the intermediary between the manufacturer and retailer
Wholesaler, sells goods or merchandise to retailers
Franchised dealership, local franchised distribution
Drug dealer, supplies illegal drugs
Merchant, a professional dealing with trade

See also

Supply chain
Supply network 
Supply chain network
Supply (disambiguation)
Vendor (supply chain)